Nikolaos Dosis (born 25 January 2001) is a professional footballer currently playing as a midfielder for Olympiakos Nicosia. He has represented both Greece and Sweden at youth international level.

Career statistics

Club

Notes

References

2001 births
Living people
Swedish footballers
Sweden youth international footballers
Greek footballers
Greece youth international footballers
Swedish people of Greek descent
Association football midfielders
AIK Fotboll players
Östersunds FK players
Allsvenskan players
Superettan players
Olympiakos Nicosia players